Highgate Park, more commonly known by its former name the Julia Farr Centre, was a hospital and care facility for disabled people in Fullarton, South Australia, founded in 1879 as the Home for Incurables. It closed in April 2020.

1879: Home for Incurables
The Home for Incurables was proposed as a non-denominational charitable institution by Julia Farr née Ord (1824–1914), wife of George Henry Farr (1819–1904), Anglican priest and headmaster of St. Peter's College. She was concerned at the plight of impoverished patients of the Adelaide Hospital who were discharged as "incurable" due to the nature of their illness or disability, then had no-one to support them and nowhere to go but the Adelaide Destitute Asylum.

Farr, who had previously founded the Home for Orphans, had the support of Dr. William Gosse, who volunteered his services as chairman of a committee to raise funds for the project. An eight-roomed house on a large block of land on Fisher Street Fullarton was purchased for £1,700 and a further £300 expended on refurbishment of the home. In October 1879 ten inmates of the Destitute Asylum, young and old, male and female, were transferred to the Home. It was a condition of entry that the patient was not insane, and that the incurable disease was not contagious, although that stipulation was later occasionally waived for those suffering from tuberculosis.

It soon became apparent that the existing facility was too small, and another building with accommodation for 30 was erected on the property and opened in February 1881. An extension capable of housing another 40 patients was added to this building in 1884 and named the Gosse Memorial Wing.

Over the ensuing hundred years adjacent land was purchased as it became available, and the old buildings demolished to make way for more modern accommodation. The West Block  (Fisher Building), built between 1964 and 1967, was made obsolete by the new East Block, and largely vacated in 1978 (their centenary). The number of resident patients rose from 142 in 1928 to 400 in the 1960s to 826 by the end of 1978, the largest institution of its kind in the southern hemisphere.

1981: Julia Farr Centre/Services
In 1981 the Home for Incurables was renamed the Julia Farr Centre. During the early 1980s, the West Wing was vacated owing to asbestos being present in the building.

In 1994 the centre was renamed Julia Farr Services, continuing to provide residential care and assistance for people living with a disability, and also providing aged care services. The property on which the Fisher Building stood was sold by Disability SA to a developer in 2003. In 2006 Julia Farr Services became a part of Disability SA, and after parts of the site were sold, what remained of it was renamed Highgate Park. The former West Wing remained derelict for many years.

2006: Highgate Park
As Highgate Park, the facility continued to provide residential care for people with disabilities from the age of 15, and included an aged care unit managed by the ACH Group, until its closure in 2020. However, from 2014 it stopped accepting new residents, with the last resident moving out in 2020.

2020: Closure
The facility was closed in April 2020, and in July the state government invited suggestions from the public via an online "YourSay" questionnaire whether the property should be sold or repurposed into a new facility. Proceeds from sale of the building has to go towards something which is stipulated by South Australians with disability, as per the terms of the trust.

In April 2021 Highgate Park was put up for sale on the open market, with the proviso that any proceeds would be "used to benefit South Australians living with disability". Minister for Human Services, Michelle Lensink, is the sole trustee of the trust that owns Highgate Park, the Home for the Incurables Trust. The government agency Renewal SA has been appointed to manage the sale.

Repurposing Old Buildings

Various development proposals for the Fisher Building fell through after its sale in 2003 and the building, which had meanwhile become the target for vandals and graffiti artists, was sold to Living Choice and demolished in 2011 to make way for a five-storey retirement complex.

The Gosse Building, on the corner of Fisher and Highgate Streets, has been operated as a student residence since 1997, known as Gosse International Student Accommodation. The seven-acre site, which includes a 9-story hospital building, a chapel, an administration building, and four acres of green space and car parks, was advertised for sale in early 2021 by Renewal SA, but  the managers and residents of Gosse are fighting to save the building from inclusion in the sale package.

In July 2021, the building was temporarily reopened by the SA government as a COVID-19 vaccine centre.

Gosse International Student Residence Controversy 
After the closures of the 9-storey Highgate Park Tower hospital building, the Round House administration building and the chapel in 2020, the only building that remains open and operating on the 7 acre Highgate Park site is Gosse International Student Residence. The Gosse building opened in 1949 as hospital staff accommodation but was repurposed in 1997 as university student accommodation. The Gosse Building now provides affordable rental accommodation ($165/week) for 63 residents, most of whom are international university students.

The Highgate Park site, including the Gosse building, is owned by the Home for Incurables Trust. The sole trustee and registered proprietor of the Highgate Park site is South Australian Minister for Human Services, Michelle Lensink. After the closure of the Highgate Park hospital in April, 2020, the South Australian government conducted a YourSAy (sic) public consultation survey in July, 2020, for ideas about future use of the Highgate Park site. The residents, workers and management of the Gosse building were unaware and were not informed of the YourSAy survey. After the YourSAy survey was completed the South Australian government commissioned the consultancy Think Human to conduct stakeholder engagement surveys of members of the disabled and local communities and others for ideas on future use of the Highgate Park site. Despite being the only people living and working on the Highgate Park site at the time, the South Australian government chose to exclude all Gosse residents, staff and management from the local community engagement process for ideas on future use of the Highgate Park site.

Gosse residents, facing the prospect of homelessness if the Gosse building is demolished and its land site sold and redeveloped as part of the sale and redevelopment of the Highgate Park site, launched a campaign in December, 2021 to save Gosse International Student Residence. Gosse residents support the commercial proposal of the Gosse Business manager to purchase the Gosse Building and its land site as a parcel of land separate to the sale of the remainder of the Highgate Park site to preserve Gosse as affordable student accommodation.

Officers
The following people served on the Julia Farr Centre committee:
Chairman, committee of management
Dr William Gosse 1878 to 1881
Dr R. T. Wylde (1820–1903) 1881 to 1895
Henry Scott 1895 to 1907
G. F. Claridge 1907 to 1931
H. Koeppen-Wendt 1931 to ?
Dr. F. Humphrey Makln
Archdeacon Clampett (1860–1953) 1940
Hon. Secretary
A. MacGeorge, perhaps Alexander Macgeorge JP (c. 1826–1908)
G. J. Shirreff Bowyear 1880 to 1888
J. H. Cunningham 1888 to 1909
A. E. H. Evans 1909 to 1948
R. G. Rees 1948 to

References

Further reading
 Includes a great deal of detail not included in this article.
 Dickey, Brian. 'Farr, Julia Warren (1824–1914)', Australian Dictionary of Biography, National Centre of Biography, Australian National University, published first in hardcopy 2005.
 History of Disability in SA: Home for Incurables

Hospitals in Adelaide
Buildings and structures in Adelaide
Disability organisations based in Australia